Trump Tower is a mixed-use skyscraper in Midtown Manhattan in New York City.

Trump Tower or Trump Towers may also refer to:

Buildings 
 Trump Tower Manila, Philippines
 Trump Tower Punta del Este, Uruguay
 Trump Towers (Sunny Isles Beach), Florida, US
 Trump Towers Istanbul, Turkey
 Trump Towers Pune, India
 Trump International Hotel and Tower (Chicago), Illinois, US
 Trump International Hotel and Tower (Honolulu), Hawaii, US
 Trump International Hotel and Tower (New York City), New York, US

Buildings commonly known as "Trump Tower" 
 40 Wall Street, also known as The Trump Building, a 70-story skyscraper in New York City, US
 Trump Hotel Las Vegas, Las Vegas, Nevada, US
 Trump Parc, New York City, US
 Trump Parc Stamford, Stamford, Connecticut, US
 Trump Park Avenue, Manhattan, US
 Trump World Tower, New York City, US

Unfulfilled proposals 
 Trump Tower (Tampa), Florida, US (incomplete, abandoned)
 Trump Tower Europe, Berlin or Stuttgart or Frankfurt, Germany (proposed, never built)
 Trump Tower Moscow, Russia (planned, never built)
 Trump Towers Atlanta, Georgia, US (planned, never built)
 Trump Towers Rio, Brazil (proposed, never built)
 Trump International Hotel and Tower (Baku), Azerbaijan (construction stopped in 2015)
 Trump International Hotel and Tower (Dubai), United Arab Emirates (proposed, never built)
 Trump International Hotel and Tower (New Orleans), US (proposed, never built)
 Trump Ocean Resort Baja Mexico, Tijuana, Mexico (proposed, never built)

Formerly called “Trump Tower” 
Trump International Hotel and Tower Toronto, now The St. Regis Toronto, Canada
 Trump International Hotel and Tower (Vancouver), now the Paradox Hotel Vancouver, British Columbia, Canada
Trump Ocean Club International Hotel and Tower, now JW Marriott Panama, Panama
Trump SoHo, now The Dominick, New York City, US
 Trump Tower (White Plains), now The Tower at City Place, New York, US

Other uses 
 Trump Tower (novel), a 2011 novel by Jeffrey Robinson, originally credited to Donald Trump

See also
 List of properties named after Donald Trump
 Trump (disambiguation)
 Trump International Hotel and Tower
 Trump Plaza (disambiguation)

Architectural disambiguation pages